Silvana Stanco (born 6 January 1993) is an Italian sport shooter.

She participated at the 2018 ISSF World Shooting Championships, winning a medal.

References

External links

Living people
1993 births
Italian female sport shooters
Trap and double trap shooters
Sportspeople from Zürich
Universiade gold medalists for Italy
Universiade medalists in shooting
Shooters at the 2019 European Games
European Games medalists in shooting
European Games gold medalists for Italy
Medalists at the 2013 Summer Universiade
Shooters at the 2020 Summer Olympics
20th-century Italian women
21st-century Italian women